The United States ambassador to Sierra Leone is the official representative of the government of the United States to the government of Sierra Leone.

Ambassadors

See also
Sierra Leone – United States relations
Foreign relations of Sierra Leone
Ambassadors of the United States

References
United States Department of State: Background notes on Sierra Leone

External links
United States Department of State: Chiefs of Mission for Sierra Leone
United States Department of State: Sierra Leone
United States Embassy in Freetown

Sierra Leone
United States